Gundremmingen is a municipality in the district of Günzburg in Bavaria in Germany. It is well known for the Gundremmingen Nuclear Power Plant.

Gundremmingen Nuclear Power Station

Gundremmingen is the location of the nuclear power station Kernkraftwerk Gundremmingen, with nominal electrical power 2688 MW.

References

Populated places in Günzburg (district)